Hydeia Brodbent (born 14 June 1984) is a United-States-based HIV/AIDS activist.

Early life
Broadbent was born in 1984 with undiagnosed HIV. She was adopted at 6 weeks old by Loren and Patricia Broadbent. Her adoptive parents found out she had HIV three years after her adoption. 

Not much had been known about Hydeia, as her birth mother had left her at a Las Vegas hospital. Three years later, that hospital called Hydeia's adoptive parents when Hydeia's birth mother gave birth at the same hospital to another child and left him there, as both mother and child tested positive for HIV. The Broadbents tested Hydeia soon after, and she also tested positive for HIV. 

Her adoptive mother signed her up for a research trial to hopefully find a treatment that would work for Hydeia. Growing up, Hydeia regularly had brain and blood infections, pneumonia, and fungal infections in her brain.

It was predicted that she would not survive childhood, and would die at the age of 5. Despite all predictions, she survived. However, when she was five, she developed AIDS.

Life and activism
Broadbent began her activism at age 6, by speaking about living with HIV/AIDS. She initially  got involved with speaking on the subject through Elizabeth Glaser, the late creator of the Elizabeth Glaser Pediatric AIDS Foundation. The two met while Hydeia was undergoing treatment at the National Institutes of Health. Glaser asked Hydeia's mother to let Hydeia speak publicly about having HIV/AIDS, and she acquiesced. 

Hydeia went on to speak at many events, including AIDS benefit concerts, documentaries, college campus education events, and talk shows. She appeared on the Oprah Winfrey Show in 1996. Recently, she appeared on Oprah's Where Are They Now, as she was one of the most-requested guests to be revisited. 

She appeared on a Nickelodeon special along with Magic Johnson. Two years after the special, she established the Hydeia L. Broadbent Foundation and received a Black Achievement Award from Jet magazine. She also appeared in Essence, and on The Maury Povich Show, Good Morning America, and at the 1996 Republican National Convention. At the Republican National Convention, she famously stated "I am the future, and I have AIDS." In 2002, her family published a book entitled You Get Past The Tears, and the family appeared in 2004 on Extreme Home Makeover. 

 Broadbent speaks on the behalf of the Magic Johnson Foundation and other AIDS activist organizations in order to educate people about HIV/AIDS, raise awareness, and fight discrimination against those living with HIV/AIDS. She also is involved in screening drives, along with actress Jurnee Smollett-Bell. Broadbent has traveled extensively both nationally and internationally to speak to others.

Broadbent takes three antiretroviral pills a day, and the majority of her medical payments come out of pocket. According to her, "HIV is not a death sentence, but it's a life sentence...[y]ou'll be taking pills forever, going to the doctor and fighting for insurance forever." She hopes that by sharing her story, things will begin to change.

References

  

1984 births
Living people
American adoptees
People with HIV/AIDS
Place of birth missing (living people)
HIV/AIDS activists
American child activists
People from Las Vegas
21st-century American women